Frank Teräskari (17 July 1921 – 26 June 2004) was a Finnish weightlifter. He competed at the 1948 Summer Olympics and the 1952 Summer Olympics.

References

1921 births
2004 deaths
Finnish male weightlifters
Olympic weightlifters of Finland
Weightlifters at the 1948 Summer Olympics
Weightlifters at the 1952 Summer Olympics
Sportspeople from Helsinki